Nathavaram is a village in Anakapalli district in the state of Andhra Pradesh in India. One of the oldest temples in Nathavaram is Ram Mandir.

References 

Villages in Anakapalli district